The 2018 Craven District Council election took place on 3 May 2018 to elect members of Craven District Council in North Yorkshire, England. One third of the council was up for election and the Conservative party stayed in overall control of the council.

Overall result

Ward results

Aire Valley with Lothersdale

Bentham

Gargrave and Malhamdale

Glusburn

Hellifield and Long Preston

Ingleton and Clapham

Penyghent

Settle and Ribblebanks

Sutton-in-Craven

References

Craven
Craven District Council elections